is a visual novel video game developed by 5pb. It was originally released for the Xbox One in 2015 in Japan, with PlayStation Vita and PlayStation 4 versions following in 2016 in Japan, North America and Europe. A Windows version was released on April 24, 2017. The game is based on the 2012 anime series Psycho-Pass.

Plot 
The story's backdrop is a dystopian future Tokyo where people can be preemptively imprisoned for their propensity to commit crimes, based on a technology-enabled personality scan called a Psycho-Pass. The game takes place in a timeline within the anime's first 12 episodes. The player controls one of two characters: inspector Nadeshiko Kugatachi, who is missing memories of her past, or enforcer Takuma Tsurugi, whose lover is missing.  The antagonist is a rogue artificial intelligence named Alpha, whose objective of bringing happiness to individuals through unsanctioned means brings him into conflict with the government. Alpha attempts to provide happiness through chemical control, mass manipulation, and eventually by reducing the human population. The three characters do not appear in the anime series; the story runs parallel to the TV show's.

Release
The game was originally released for the Xbox One on May 28, 2015, in Japan; PlayStation 4 and PlayStation Vita versions followed on March 24, 2016. NIS America released the latter two versions on September 13, 2016, in North America and on September 16, 2016, in Europe. A Windows version of the game was released on Steam on April 24, 2017.

Reception

References

External links
 
 

2015 video games
Cyberpunk video games
Dystopian video games
Fiction about government
Video games about mass surveillance
Nippon Ichi Software games
PlayStation 4 games
PlayStation Vita games
Psycho-Pass
Video games about police officers
Video games based on anime and manga
Video games developed in Japan
Visual novels
Windows games
Xbox One games